NA-47 (Tribal Area-VIII) is a constituency for the National Assembly of Pakistan comprising Orakzai District.

Members of Parliament

2002–2018: NA-39 (Tribal Area-IV)

Since 2018: NA-47 (Tribal Area-VIII)

Election 2002 

General elections were held on 10 Oct 2002. Ghazi Gulab Jamal an Independent candidate won by 11,186 votes.

Election 2008 

The result of general election 2008 in this constituency is given below.

Result 
Jawad Hussain succeeded in the election 2008 and became the member of National Assembly.

Election 2013 

General elections were held on 11 May 2013. Ghazi Gulab Jamali an Independent candidate won  by 7,922 votes and became the  member of National Assembly.

Election 2018 

General elections were held on 25 July 2018.

See also
NA-46 (Tribal Area-VII)
NA-48 (Tribal Area-IX)

References

External links 
 Election result's official website

47
47